Waagenina is an extinct genus of ammonite.

References

Goniatitida genera
Cyclolobaceae
Permian animals of Europe